Reality Horror Night is a 2009 horror comedy film created by Sean Pomper and directed by Douglas Elford Argent who wrote it with Nicholas Mark Harding. The film features mostly reality stars who portray themselves on a twisted new reality show. It was filmed in Glen Cove, New York at the Glen Cove Mansion. The film was released on October 31, 2009.

Plot
The cast enters a mansion to compete on a new reality show for $1 million but with an unexpected twist. Mysteriously, a cast member disappears but without a formal elimination ceremony. When more and more castmates start disappearing in this fashion it is up to the remaining cast to discover how this game is really played.

Cast

References

External links
 
 

2009 horror films
2009 films
American comedy horror films
2009 comedy horror films
2009 comedy films
2000s English-language films
2000s American films